Bo'ness Hill Climb is a hillclimbing course on the Kinneil Estate (site of the historic Kinneil House near Bo'ness, Scotland. It is sometimes referred to as Kinneil Hill Climb. Opening in 1932, it was Scotland's first purpose-built motorsport venue. In 1932 and 1933 events were organised, for motorbikes only, by the West Lothian Motor Cycle Club. The first meeting open to both cars and bikes was organised jointly by WLMCC, Scottish Sporting Car Club and Bo'ness Town Council. There were plans to build a racing circuit on the same land, effectively turning Kinneil into a motorsport complex, but they never came to anything.

In March 1947 Motor Sport reported: "Kinneil hill at Bo'ness will provide an 880-yard course, having been lengthened by 140 yds." However, this was by no means the first alteration to the track. From 1932 to 1935 it consisted simply of a straight road running from the Courtyard section. The start line was moved downhill in 1936, so drivers had to negotiate what is now known as Old Paddock bend and the entrance to the Courtyard. The following year, it was moved further still, bringing Crawyett bend into play. At the same time, a fast right-left called the Snake was introduced to the upper part of the course.

The first round of the inaugural British Hill Climb Championship was staged at Bo'ness on 17 May 1947. It was won by George Abecassis, who went on to finish second in the Championship to Raymond Mays. The other four rounds that year were held at Bouley Bay, Craigantlet, Prescott and Shelsley Walsh. Unlike Bo'ness, all of these are still used as Championship venues.

On the evening of 29 June 1953, the BBC organised a special televised event with an 'England versus Scotland' format. Competitors ran in matched pairs with two points for a win and three where the class record was broken. The final score was England 26, Scotland 16. Ken Wharton broke the absolute hill record in 33.61 seconds, "but it was not felt that these could be accepted as 'official' times."

Scottish Sporting Car Club continued to organise events at Bo'ness until low driver and spectator numbers persuaded them to stop after the 1954 season. Lothian Car Club brought the venue back to life in 1959 but was forced to abandon it after the June 1966 meeting when Bo'ness Town Council sold the upper section to a developer. A large part of the track, including Snake Bend, is now covered by a housing estate, but a small brick enclosure built to protect the timing gear at the finish line is still visible on the path alongside Provost Road which was formerly the top straight. Lothian CC began running events at Doune in 1968 and has continued to do so for over 50 years.

In 2007 a Revival Club was formed with a view of running speed hill climbing again at Bo'ness. Revival meetings have been held every year since 2008 and are open to classic and historic cars.

Bo'ness Hill Climb past winners

Key: R = Course Record.

Footnotes

See also

 Fintray Hillclimb
 Forrestburn Hillclimb
 Rest and Be Thankful Speed Hill Climb.

External links
 Bo'ness Hill Climb Revival: 

Hillclimbs
Motorsport in Scotland